Bukić is a surname. Notable people with the surname include:

 Enver Bukić (1937 – 2017), Slovenian chess grandmaster
 Luka Bukić (born 1994), water polo player from Croatia
 Perica Bukić (born 1966), Croatian former professional water polo player and politician